is a town located primarily on Amami Ōshima, in Ōshima District, Kagoshima Prefecture, Japan.

As of June 2013, the town had an estimated population of 9,379 and a population density of 39.1 persons per km². The total area was 239.91 km².

Geography
Setouchi occupies the southern portion of Amami Ōshima, facing the East China Sea to the east and the Pacific Ocean to the west. It also includes numerous offshore islands of Amami Ōshima, including the inhabited islands of Kakeromajima, Ukejima and Yoroshima.

Climate
The climate is classified as humid subtropical (Köppen climate classification Cfa) with very warm summers and mild winters. Precipitation is high throughout the year, but is highest in the months of May, June and September. The area is subject to frequent typhoons.

Surrounding municipalities
Amami
Uken

History
Higashikata Village was established on April 1, 1908. It became the town of Koniya on April 1, 1936. As with all of the Amami Islands, the village came under the administration of the United States from July 1, 1946 to December 25, 1953.  On September 1, 1956 Koniya merged with three neighboring villages to form the town of Setouchi.

Economy
The town economy is primarily based on agriculture, with sugar cane and citrus horticulture as the main crops. Industries include shochu refining and commercial fishing.

Transportation

Ports
Koniya Port, with ferry connections to Kagoshima and to the other Amami islands.

Highway
Japan National Route 58

Noted people from Setouchi
Ikue Asazaki – musician
Chitose Hajime – musician
Tadashi Kanehisa – folklorist
Kenji Midori – Karateka
Shomu Nobori -  Russian translator
Meisei Chikara - sumo wrestler

References

External links

  
  

Towns in Kagoshima Prefecture
Populated coastal places in Japan